Petar Georgiev (born 7 March 1961) is a Bulgarian diver. He competed in two events at the 1980 Summer Olympics.

References

1961 births
Living people
Bulgarian male divers
Olympic divers of Bulgaria
Divers at the 1980 Summer Olympics
Place of birth missing (living people)